Achttienhoven is a hamlet in the Dutch province of South Holland. It is a part of the municipality of Nieuwkoop, and lies about 7 km north of Woerden.

The statistical area "Achttienhoven", which also includes the surrounding countryside, has a population of around 130.

Between 1817 and 1855, Achttienhoven was a separate municipality, sometimes called "Achttienhoven en de Bosch".

The nature reserve De Haeck lies northwest of the hamlet.

References

Populated places in South Holland
Former municipalities of South Holland
Geography of Nieuwkoop